Colleen Curran is a Quebec playwright, novelist, teacher and actor who has written more than 20 plays that have been staged across Canada, the United States and Australia.  Her three comedic novels about a singing waitress are titled Something Drastic, Overnight Sensation and Guests of Chance.

References

Reid, Gregory J., Constructing English Quebec Ethnicity: Colleen Curran's Something Drastic and Josée Legault's L'invention d'une minorité : Les Anglo-Québécois, MPublishing, University of Michigan Library, 1998.

Canadian women novelists
Canadian women dramatists and playwrights
Actresses from Quebec
20th-century Canadian novelists
21st-century Canadian novelists
20th-century Canadian dramatists and playwrights
21st-century Canadian dramatists and playwrights
Writers from Quebec
Living people
20th-century Canadian women writers
21st-century Canadian women writers
Year of birth missing (living people)